This is a list of notable people from Malappuram district, Kerala, India. Malappuram district is one of the 14 districts of Kerala state.

 A. Vijayaraghavan - Former member of Rajya Sabha and the state secretary of CPI(M).
 A. P. Anil Kumar - former minister of Kerala.
 A. R. Raja Raja Varma - Malayalam poet and grammatician known as Kerala Panini (belongs to Parappanad royal family).
 Abdul Nediyodath - an Indian footballer.
 Abdurahiman Randathani - an Indian politician.
 Achyutha Pisharadi - a Sanskrit grammarian, astronomer and mathematician.
 Adil Ibrahim - Actor.
 Ahmad Kutty - a North American Islamic scholar.
 Ajijesh Pachat - Malayalam novelist, short story writer, and columnist.
 Akkitham Achuthan Namboothiri - Malayalam poet and essayist. (Born at Kumaranellur, a border village between Malappuram and Palakkad districts. He was a writer from the Ponnani Kalari)
 Akkitham Narayanan - painter.
 Ali Musliyar - was an Indian freedom fighter.
 Ammu Swaminathan - Independence activist and a member of Constituent Assembly of India.
 Anas Edathodika -  an Indian professional footballer.
 Aneesh G. Menon - is an Indian actor
 Anikha - actress.
 Aparna Nair - an Indian actress.
 Arjun Jayaraj - an Indian professional footballer.
 Artist Namboothiri - an Indian painter.
 Aryadan Muhammed - former minister of Kerala.
 Aryadan Shoukath - Indian film producer.
 Ashique Kuruniyan - an Indian professional footballer.
 Asif Saheer - an Indian soccer player.
 Azad Moopen - an Indian doctor and philanthropist.
 Azhvanchery Thamprakkal - Former chief of Nambudiris of Kerala.
 B. M. Kutty - was a journalist and activist.
 Balamani Amma - Writer of Malayalam literature.
 C. Karunakara Menon - was an Indian journalist and politician.
 C. Radhakrishnan - an Indian writer and film director of Malayalam language.
 C. N. Ahmad Moulavi - was an Indian writer of Malayalam literature.
 Chakkeeri Ahemed Kutty - former minister of Kerala and former speaker of Kerala Legislative Assembly.
 Chalilakath Kunahmed Haji - was a social reformer.
 Cherukad - a Malayalam playwright, novelist, poet, and political activist.
 Damodara - was an astronomer-mathematician.
 Deepu Pradeep - an Indian scriptwriter.
 Devdutt Padikkal - an Indian cricketer.
 Dhanish Karthik - an Indian actor.
 Dileep K. Nair - an Indian educationist, skill development campaigner, social activist, and publisher.
 E. Harikumar - Malayalam novelist and short story writer.
 E. Moidu Moulavi - was an Indian freedom fighter, and an Islamic scholar.
 E. Sreedharan - Metroman of India.
 E. K. Imbichi Bava - was an Indian politician.
 E. M. S. Namboodiripad - The first Chief Minister of Kerala and the founder of CPI(M).
 E. T. Mohammed Basheer - former minister of Kerala.
 Elamaram Kareem - former minister of Kerala.
 Edasseri Govindan Nair - was an Indian poet.
 Elamaram Kareem - Former minister of Kerala and Member of Rajya Sabha.
 Faisal Kutty - a lawyer, academic, writer, public speaker, and human rights activist.
 Gopinath Muthukad - a magician, and motivational speaker.
 Govinda Bhattathiri - was an Indian astrologer and astronomer.
 Hari Nair - an Indian cinematographer.
 Hemanth Menon - an Indian actor.
 Indrajith Sukumaran - film actor and playback singer.
 Iqbal Kuttippuram -  an Indian screenwriter and homoeopathic physician.
 Jayasree Kalathil - Writer, translator, mental health researcher, and activist.
 Jishnu Balakrishnan - an Indian professional footballer.
 K. Abdurahman - Founder of Chaliyar movement.
 K. Avukader Kutty Naha - a former deputy chief minister of Kerala.
 K. C. S. Paniker - was a metaphysical and abstract painter
 K. C. Manavedan Raja -  was an Indian aristocrat.
 K. M. Asif - an Indian cricketer.
 K. M. Maulavi - An Indian freedom fighter, social reformer and the founding vice-president of IUML Malabar district committee.
 K. P. A. Majeed - former Chief Whip of the Government of Kerala.
 K. P. Ramanunni - is a novelist and short-story writer. 
 K. T. Irfan - an Indian athlete.
 K. T. Jaleel - former minister of Kerala.
 K. T. Muhammed- was a Malayalam playwright and screenwriter.
 K. V. Rabiya - Social worker.
 K. V. Ramakrishnan - a Malayalam–language poet and journalist.
 Kadavanad Kuttikrishnan - was a Malayalam poet and journalist.
 Kalamandalam Kalyanikutty Amma - a resurrector of Mohiniyattam.
 Kamala Surayya - Writer of Malayalam literature.
 Kerala Varma Valiya Koil Thampuran - Malayalam poet and translator, also known as Kalidasa of Kerala (belongs to Parappanad royal family).
 Krishnachandran - an  Indian actor, dubbing artist, and playback singer.
 Kuttikrishna Marar - an Indian essayist and literary critic of Malayalam literature.
 Lakshmi Sahgal - a revolutionary of the Indian independence movement, an officer of the Indian National Army, and the Minister of Women's Affairs in the Azad Hind government.
 M. Govindan - Writer of Malayalam literature.
 M. Swaraj - an Indian politician.
 M. G. S. Narayanan - is an Indian historian, and academic and political commentator.
 M. K. Vellodi - former Indian diplomat.
 M. M. Akbar - an Islamic scholar, and an expert in comparative religion.
 M. P. Abdussamad Samadani 
Member of parliament MALAPPURAM constituency-
 M. P. M. Ahammed Kurikkal - former minister of Kerala.
 M. P. M. Menon - was an Indian diplomat, ambassador to several countries.
 M. T. Vasudevan Nair - Malayalam author, screenplay writer and film director. (Born at Kudallur, a border village between Malappuram and Palakkad districts. He is a writer from the Ponnani Kalari.)
 Malayath Appunni - a Malayalam language poet and children's writer.
 Manjalamkuzhi Ali - former minister of Kerala.
 Mankada Ravi Varma - was an Indian cinematographer and director.
 Manorama Thampuratti - was a Sanskrit writer.
 Mashoor Shereef - an Indian professional footballer.
 Melattur Sahadevan - a Carnatic music vocalist. 
 Melpathur Narayana Bhattathiri - was a mathematical linguist.
 Mersheena Neenu - actress.
 Mohammed Irshad - an Indian professional footballer.
 Mohamed Salah - an Indian footballer.
 Mohanakrishnan Kaladi - a Malayalam poet.
 Moyinkutty Vaidyar - was a Mappila pattu poet.
 Mrinalini Sarabhai - Indian classical dancer.
 Muhammad Musthafa - an Indian film actor and director.
 Muhsin Parari - an Indian film director, writer, and lyricist.
 Nalakath Soopy - former minister of Kerala.
 Nalapat Narayana Menon - Writer of Malayalam literature.
 Nandanar - was an Indian writer of Malayalam literature.
 Nilambur Ayisha - an actress in the Malayalam film industry and drama.
 Nilambur Balan - was a Malayalam actor.
 Nirupama Rao - former foreign secretary of India.
 P. Sreeramakrishnan - former speaker of Kerala Legislative Assembly.
 P. Surendran - is a writer, columnist, art critic, and a philanthropist.
 P. K. Abdu Rabb - former minister of Kerala.
 P. K. Kunhalikutty - former minister of Kerala.
 P. K. Warrier - an Ayurvedic physician and a Padma Bhushan winner.
 P. P. Ramachandran - is a Malayalam poet.
 P. V. Abdul Wahab - Businessman, and a member of Rajya Sabha.
 Paloli Mohammed Kutty - former minister of Kerala.
 Parameshvara - was a major Indian mathematician and astronomer.
 Parvathy Jayadevan - an Indian playback singer.
 Poonthanam Nambudiri - was a Malayalam poet.
 Premji - was a social reformer, cultural leader, and actor.
 Prithviraj Sukumaran - actor, director, producer, playback singer, and distributor.
 Pulapre Balakrishnan - an Indian economist and educationalist.
 Pulikkottil Hyder -  was a Mappila pattu poet.
 Rajeev Nair - an Indian writer, lyricist, and producer.
 Ranjith Padinhateeri - an Indian biological physicist and a professor.
 Rashin Rahman - an Indian actor.
 Raja Ravi Varma - Indian painter and artist (belongs to Parappanad royal family).
 Ravi Menon - Actor.
 Ravi Vallathol - was an Indian actor.
 Rinshad Reera - Student Activist.
 Salam Bappu -  an Indian film director.
 Salman Kalliyath - an Indian professional footballer.
 Sangita Madhavan Nair - an Indian actress.
 Sankaran Embranthiri - was a Kathakali musician.
 Savithri Rajeevan - an Indian poet, short story writer, and painter.
 Sayyid Sanaullah Makti Tangal - was a social reformer.
 Shahabaz Aman - an Indian playback singer and composer.
 Shanavas K Bavakutty - is an Indian film director.
 Shweta Menon - an Indian model, actress, and television anchor.
 Shylan - Malayalam novelist and short story writer.
 Sithara - an Indian playback singer, composer, and an occasional actor.
 Sooraj Thelakkad - An actor.
 Sukumaran - was an Indian film actor and producer.
 Sunny Wayne - Film actor (stayed during higher education).
 Syed Muhammedali Shihab Thangal - was a religious leader and politician.
 T. A. Razzaq - was an Indian screenwriter.
 T. K. Hamza - former minister of Kerala.
 T. K. Padmini - was an Indian painter.
 T. M. Nair - was an Indian political activist of Dravidian movement.
 Thunchaththu Ezhuthachan- was a Malayalam poet and linguist.
 Tirur Nambissan - was a Kathakali singer.
 U. A. Beeran - former minister of Kerala.
 U.Jimshad - an Indian professional footballer.
 U. Sharaf Ali - a former Indian International football player.
 Unni Menon - an Indian playback singer.
 Uroob - was a writer of Malayalam literature.
 V. Abdurahiman - Minister of Kerala.
 V. C. Balakrishna Panicker - an Indian poet and writer.
 V. T. Bhattathiripad - Social reformer (hailed from erstwhile Ponnani taluk).
 Vaidyaratnam P. S. Warrier - was an Ayurvedic physician.
 Vaidyaratnam Triprangode Moossad - was an Ayurvedic physician.
 Vallathol Narayana Menon -  was a Malayalam poet.
 Variyan Kunnath Kunjahammed Haji - an Indian Freedom Fighter.
 Vazhenkada Kunchu Nair - was a Kathakali master and a Padma Shri winner.
 Vazhenkada Vijayan - Retired principal of Kerala Kalamandalam.
 Veliyankode Umar Khasi - Freedom fighter and poet.
 Vinay Govind - an Indian film director.
 Zainuddin Makhdoom II - The author of Tuhfat Ul Mujahideen.
 Zakariya Mohammed - an Indian Film director, screenwriter, and actor.
 Zakeer Mundampara - an Indian footballer.
 Zeenath - actress.

See also

Administration of Malappuram
Education in Malappuram
History of Malappuram
List of desoms in Malappuram (1981)
List of Gram Panchayats in Malappuram
List of villages in Malappuram
Transportation in Malappuram
Malappuram metropolitan area
Malappuram district
South Malabar

References